Justice Celebrezze may refer to:

Frank Celebrezze, chief justice of the Ohio Supreme Court
Frank D. Celebrezze Jr., associate justice of the Ohio Supreme Court
James Celebrezze, associate justice of the Ohio Supreme Court